A constitutional referendum was held in Malta between 2 and 4 May 1964. The new constitution was approved by 54.5% of voters, and came into effect on 21 September 1964. It was effectively a referendum on independence, as the new constitution gave the country self-government.

Question
The question put to the electorate was "Do you approve of the constitution proposed by the Government of Malta, endorsed by the Legislative Assembly, and published in the Malta Gazette?

Results

References

Referendums in Malta
Malta
1964 in Malta
Malta
Constitutional referendums
May 1964 events in Europe